Pinguicula lithophytica is a species of butterwort that is endemic to the central region of Cuba. It was described by Cristina M. Panfet-Valdés and Paul Temple in 2008. They placed it in subgenus Isoloba, section Agnata, noting that there were morphological similarities between P. lithophytica and P. jackii.

References

lithophytica
Endemic flora of Cuba
Carnivorous plants of North America
Plants described in 2008